Bhakta Kannappa is a 1976 Indian Telugu-language film directed by Bapu. The film is a remake of 1954 Kannada movie Bedara Kannappa starring Rajkumar which was based on the life of Shaiva devotee, Kannappa Nayanar.

Credits

Cast
 Krishnam Raju as Arjuna/Kannappa/Thinnadu
 Vanisri as Neela
 M. Balaiah as  Lord Shiva
 Rao Gopal Rao as Kailasanatha Shastri
 Sarathi as Kashinatha Shastri
 Allu Ramalingaiah
 Sreedhar as Mallanna
 Prabhakar Reddy as Neela's father
 Mukkamala as Jara Rashtrika (Vedic form of Peddavema Reddy)
 P. R. Varalakshmi as  Goddess Parvati
 Jhansi
 Baby Varalakshmi
 Baby Rohini
 Jaya Malini as Ranjana

Crew
 Director: Bapu
 Writer: Mullapudi Venkata Ramana
 Producer: U. Suryanarayana Raju
 Production executive: Jayakrishna
 Production Company: Gopi Krishna Combines
 Original Music: "P. Adinarayana Rao"   Chellapilla Satyam
 Cinematography: V. S. R. Swamy
 Film Editing: Mandapati Ramachandraiah
 Art Direction: Vaali and V. Bhaskara Raju
 Camera Operator: S. Gopal Reddy
 Assistant Cameramen: M. V. Raghu and Sharath
 Playback singers: S. Janaki, S. P. Balasubrahmanyam, P. Susheela and V. Ramakrishna

Production
Krishnam Raju was inspired by Ben-Hur (1959) and wanted to produce a film just like it. As such, this film was influenced by the film Ben-Hur. For songs recording, the unit went to tribal areas and composed their tunes and rhythms as songs for the film. In fact, the song Enniyallo was based on the research they had done.

Soundtrack 
 "Aakasham Dinchala Nelavanka Tunchala" (Lyrics: Veturi; Singers: V. Ramakrishna and P. Susheela; Cast: Krishnam Raju and Vanisree)
 "Kanda Gelichindi Kanne Dorikindi" (Lyrics: C. Narayana Reddy; Singers: V. Ramakrishna and P. Susheela; Cast: Krishnam Raju, Vanisree and Others)
 "Om Namassivaya Srikantalokesha" (Lyrics: Veturi; Singer: V. Ramakrishna; Cast: Krishnam Raju and M. Balayya)
 "Paravasamuna Sivudu" (Kiratarjuneeyam) (Lyrics: Veturi; Singer: S. P. Balasubrahmanyam; Cast: Krishnam Raju and M. Balayya)
 "Siva Siva Ananelara" (Lyrics: C. Narayana Reddy; Singer: S. Janaki)
 "Siva Siva Sankara Bhaktava Sankara" (Lyrics: Veturi; Singer: V. Ramakrishna; Cast: Krishnam Raju)
 "Thalli Thandri" - (Singer: P. Susheela)
 "Thinavayya" (male) - V. Ramakrishna
 "Thinavayya" (female) - P. Susheela
 "Thakita Thakita" - (Singer: S. P. Balasubrahmanyam)
 "Yenniyallo Yenniyallo Chandamama" - (Lyrics: Arudra; Singers: V. Ramakrishna and P. Susheela; Cast: Krishnam Raju and Vanisree)

Awards
 National Film Award for Best Audiography - S. P. Ramanathan

References

External links
 

1976 films
Hindu devotional films
Indian biographical films
1970s biographical films
Films directed by Bapu
Films produced by Krishnam Raju
Films scored by Satyam (composer)
1970s Telugu-language films
Films that won the Best Audiography National Film Award
Telugu remakes of Kannada films